In 2005-06, FC Porto won the Championship for the 5th time in a row with 10 points of advantage over the runners-up S.L. Benfica. FC Porto also won the Portuguese Cup, playing in the final with Juventude de Viana and winning 7-4 and the Portuguese SuperCup, winning against Benfica in a two-legged final. These competitions are organized by Federação Portuguesa de Patinagem. In the European competitions, FC Porto was the runner up on the Champions League.

Domestic Club Competitions

The Championship
The Rink Hockey Portuguese Championship in 2005-06 had 14 teams participating and was divided in 2 phases. In the first, every team played each other, each team making 26 games. A win as awarded 3 points, a draw 1 point and a loss 0 points. After the 1st phase, the points of all teams were divided in half (if 21, then 21/2 = 10,5 = 11) and the championship was divided into 2 groups: A and B. The Group A had the 6 best teams in the 1st phase fighting for the title. Group B had the other 8 teams fighting to avoid relegation.

FC Porto was the champion for the 5th time in a row.

1st Phase Table

P= Games Played
Pts= Points
Pts= Points divided by Half

2nd Phase - Group A

P = Games Played
SP = Starting Points
Pts = Points

Qualifying for European Competitions 2006/07

The top two clubes from the championship and the Portuguese Cup winner would get a spot at the European Champions League. The next three clubs in the table would get a spot in CERS Cup. As FC Porto won the Cup and had a right to a spot for finishing 1st, one spot for the European Champions League has been given to OC Barcelos and a CERS Cup spot has been given to Candelária SC.

2nd Phase - Group B

HC Braga, S Alenquer B, CD Nortecoope and Famalicense AC are relegated to 2nd Division. AD Valongo, J Ouriense, AE Física D and HC Sintra are promoted from the 2nd division to the 1st.

Portuguese Cup

Round of 16 to Final

Numbers behind the teams indicate their division.

The Final-Four games (semifinals and final) were played on 17 and 18 June 2006 in Mealhada.

Portuguese SuperCup

European Club Competitions

European Champions League

1st Round

Group stage

Group A

Final four

Follonica is European Champion, Porto is runner-up.

Cers Cup
Only CD Portosantense participated in this competition: other Portuguese teams who had the chance declined, claiming financial reasons.

Round of 16

National team

2006 European Championship
The Portuguese National team played the Rink Hockey European Championship in Monza, Italy from 16 to 22 July 2006. Portugal ended the competition in the 3rd place.

Squad

Phase I

Knockout Phase

Bracket

Quarterfinals

Semifinals

3rd Place Game

External links
1st Phase Table
SuperCup games 
Portuguese Cup games 
2nd Phase Group A Table 
2nd Phase Group B Table
For results of the European Competitions

Roller hockey in Portugal
2005 in roller hockey
2006 in roller hockey
2005 in Portuguese sport
2006 in Portuguese sport